Remo Bianco, birth name Remo Bianchi, (3 June 1922 – 23 February 1988) was an Italian painter and sculptor.

Biography 

His father, Guido, was an electrician at the theatre La Scala, a confirmed anarchist and an austere man. His mother, Giovanna Ripamonti, had studied astrology. Remo was the second of two twins, the brother Romolo died of pneumonia in 1923. He had a strong bond with his sister Lyda, who was born before the twins and became a star of the ballet.

In 1937 he enrolled at evening courses at the Brera Academy, where he met de Pisis two years later and began to  attend the Master's studio regularly; there he had the opportunity to meet other artists such as Carrà, Sironi, Savinio, Soffici, Soldati, Marini, Cantatore.

In 1941 he was enrolled as a machine-gunner on a destroyer, which was torpedoed and sunk two years later.  Bianco, rescued by the British, was interned in Tunisia where he experienced his first contact with the Middle East.

The Early Works: The Figurative Season

In 1944 he returned to Milan where he resumed his contacts with Filippo de Pisis and his studies at the Brera Academy.
In this period his works are strongly similar to the existential expressionism of the French painter Rouault, notably the self-portrait which he painted in 1945.  In his paintings large and dark lines begin to enclose thick layers of leaden and sulphurous colour. From the fifties, Bianco's portraits become increasingly speckled and the brushstrokes more disorderly, while the colours are reduced in thickness.

From Figurative Art to Abstraction:  The "Nuclear" and "Spatial Season" 
From the Nuclear Movement (founded in Milan in 1951 by Dangelo e Baj), Bianco gained a love of materials.  In his works, the features of the faces become increasingly imperceptible, giving way to paint blends.   His next progression was more radical, a composition of pigments, glass crystals, paint, glue, iridescent paste, and pebbles.  On the contrary, from Spatialism  he captured the more creative, experimental, ironic and Dadaist dimension, taking interest in the materialistic trace and chromatic writing.  The paintings are almost completely free of figures and become a layer of threads and paint strokes.
French critic Pierre Restany wrote: "We should not forget that Remo Bianco was formed during the post  - WWII period in the Milanese school of spatialism of Lucio Fontana and Carlo Cardazzo from which he drew the double lesson of energy and eclecticism - in one word, liberty".
Regarding his relationship with Spatialism movement, Italian painter Virgilio Guidi in the presentation of the catalogue of his first solo exhibition, in 1952, at venetian "Galleria del Cavallino" directed by Carlo Cardazzo, defined him as an "isolated spatialist" [spaziale isolato] as well as a "sensitive spatialist" [spaziale sensibile]. 
Successively he held many exhibitions at Cavallino and Naviglio galleries, up to the Eighties.

The Three Dimensional Artworks: 3D 
At the beginning of the fifties, Bianco began to change his geometric works on layers of glass and plastic, taking advantage of their milky or translucent transparency  to create delicate, hazy and transparent effects. In addition to these three-dimensional works he created others in wood, Plexiglas and metal, always in layers but carved in various forms. On receiving a scholarship in 1955 he travelled to the United States where he had the opportunity of meeting Jackson Pollock.

From Collages to Tableaux dorés to Appropriazioni 
In the United States Bianco learned abstract expressionism and met Jackson Pollock. So he learned the technique of drip painting, but he did not lose his love for proportions and order, giving life to his Collages.  Papers (or fabrics), again painted with signs and drippings, are cut in small squares, mixed together and recomposed as a collage or a mosaic, arranging them like a chessboard.
And it is from the development of Collages that Bianco came to create his most well known artworks:  the Tableaux dorés.  This category is not only his most numerous but also his richest in creativity; each one being unique for the colours and the amount and extent of gold leaf used. Even where small amounts of gold leaf are used the artwork does not lose its power and eloquence, but gains  in mystery and profundity.
Bianco continued to paint Tableaux dorés until the eighties; during this time these artworks began the evolution of his experiments:  the Appropriations of the seventies.  In these works gold leaf is applied to everyday objects of varying sizes.

Arte Improntale, the Testimonianze, the Sculture Neve 
Bianco developed the Arte Improntale back in 1948 by dipping objects in paint and stamping the imprint.  In the mid fifties he began to create rubber and paper casts of objects, and wrote the "Manifesto dell'Arte Improntale" (1956).  His Testimonianze() are an example of  Arte Improntale(Imprint Art); these are rows of small cellophane sachets, aligned as in the Tableaux dorés, and filled with small worn out objects, fragments of everyday life.
In the mid sixties he experimented with a new material, artificial snow, which he sprayed on the most diverse objects – and even on people.  Small objects were enclosed in showcases, and people were photographed in black and white.  The Sculture Neve (Snow Sculptures) belong to the cycle of Appropriations.

Arte Elementare 
This was one of the last experimental periods by Bianco. In the seventies, while continuing work on his other series, he returned to the fundamentals of painting by producing on backgrounds – often filled with squares – rows of small trains, flowers, fruits, carousels, tin soldiers and long-hand writing, all of which return to a world of minimal and stereotyped representations.

Writings 
 Manifesto dell’Arte Improntale, 1956
 Manifesto dell’Arte Chimica, 1964
 Manifesto della Sovrastruttura, 1965
 Milano 1972, in Teatro Angelicum catalogue, Milan 1972
 Poesia trascendentale, 1981, D’Ars, y. XXII, nr. 97
 Autobiografia, 1982, unpublished
 Milano luglio 1985, in Galleria del Naviglio exhibition catalogue, Milan 1985
 Milano gennaio 1986, in Belli Marchionne, 1987

Exhibitions 
From 1948 to February 2010 were held 61 solo exhibitions, including:
 Galleria del Naviglio, Milan (1950 – February 1954 – February 1961 – December 1961 – April 1964 – May 1965 – 1967 – February 1968 – May 1969 – September 1972 – January 1980 – 1982 – December 1988 – June 1992 – 2006)
 Galleria del Cavallino, Venezia (October 1952 – July 1954 – July 1959 – August 1961 – August 1962 – March 1963 – August 1964 – July 1985)
 Casinò Municipale, Venezia (August 1961)
 Complesso del Vittoriano Gipsoteca, Rome (December 2006)
In the same period the works were also exhibited in 80 group exhibitions organized in Italy and abroad.

Remo Bianco Foundation 

Notes

Bibliography

External links 
 Remo Bianco – Official Site

1922 births
1988 deaths
Artists from Milan
20th-century Italian painters
Italian male painters
20th-century Italian sculptors
20th-century Italian male artists
Italian male sculptors
Italian contemporary artists
Brera Academy alumni
Burials at the Cimitero Monumentale di Milano
Modern painters
Regia Marina personnel of World War II
Italian prisoners of war
World War II prisoners of war held by the United Kingdom